Omnium (Latin: of all, belonging to all) may refer to:

 Omnium, a multiple race event in track cycling in which all contestants compete against each other in six different disciplines.
 Òmnium Cultural, an association promoting the Catalan language
 Omnium II, a Thoroughbred racehorse
 Omnium, a 2005 concept album released by Teatro ZinZanni
 Omnium, the "fundamental substance of the Universe" in the novel The Third Policeman by Flann O'Brien 
 Omnium, a type of government bond involved in the Great Stock Exchange Fraud of 1814
 Omnium, a type of fictional automated robot factory in the game Overwatch (video game)

See also
 Duke of Omnium, an aristocratic title in the Palliser novels of Anthony Trollope
 Jacob Omnium, pen name of British writer Matthew James Higgins (1810-1868)